real name Kuniichi Ichikawa (國一市川), was a Japanese professional sumo wrestler from Komatsu, Ishikawa (Japan). His highest rank was maegashira 1. 
After retiring, he took the position of head coach at Dewanoumi stable, following the death of Tsunenohana from 1960 to 1968. He then was elected chairman (rijichō) of the Japan Sumo Association under the name of Musashigawa from 1968 to 1974. Unlike most of his contemporaries, he had a business education background.

Dewanoumi succession turmoil
Dewanohana became head coach at his stable because he was considered old enough for the responsibility, contrary to yokozuna Chiyonoyama who also sought the title. In 1965, his daughter married Sadanoyama, with the avowed objective of the latter of inheriting the Dewanoumi stable. This practice was common in the world of sumo, since kabu were traditionally inherited within the same family or between an apprentice and his master. However, it also denied Chiyonoyama's chance to inherit the Dewanoumi name, as he expected it being a yokozuna and senior coach (under the name Kokonoe) at the stable. Sadanoyama being formally recognized as heir in 1967 created a turmoil which resulted in Chiyonoyama willing to break off the Dewanoumi stable to found the Kokonoe stable with 10 wrestlers (including then ozeki Kitanofuji). Due to this founding breaking the unspoken rule of not allowing oyakata independence from the stable (dating back to Hitachiyama), Dewanohana permitted after a long debate the creation and expelled Chiyonoyama from the Dewanoumi ichimon.

Japan sumo association chairmanship
In 1968, he is appointed rijisho following the sudden death of the previous head (Tokitsukaze oyakata, former Futabayama). He gave the kabu of Dewanoumi to his son-in-law Sadanoyama and took upon the name of Musashigawa.  
His presidency was marked by several attempts to modernize Sumo, including the introduction of video refereeing (1969) or the renovation of Kuramae Kokugikan (1971).

Later life and death
In 1974, he handed over the chairmanship to Kasugano oyakata, and became a director to the board of the association. He continued to serve as an advisor and as the director of the Sumo Museum. After reaching retirement on February 28, 1976, he retired from the Japan Sumo Association, and died on May 30, 1987 at the age of 78. 

After his death, the Japan Sumo Association held an association funeral on June 2nd of the same year to honor his achievements, and on June 9th of the same year he was posthumously awarded the Order of the Sacred Treasure (Fifth Class).

Career record
In 1927 Tokyo and Osaka sumo merged and four tournaments a year in Tokyo and other locations began to be held.

See also
Glossary of sumo terms
List of past sumo wrestlers

References

1909 births
Japanese sumo wrestlers
Sumo people from Ishikawa Prefecture
1987 deaths